Bacon soup is a soup made with bacon. Generally a number of vegetables are added and often a thickening agent such as pearl barley, lentils or corn flour. It can be added to Italian minestrone soup to enhance the flavor.

Many variations exist, which may incorporate primary ingredients such as cabbage, beans, potato, lentils, spinach, peas, cauliflower, broccoli, leeks, pumpkin and rice.

Bacon is a common addition to many soups including creamy soups, especially those with a mild flavor that won't overpower the bacon.

See also
 List of bacon dishes
 List of soups

References

Bacon
Soups